Oregon Brewers Festival (OBF) is a four-day craft beer festival held annually from 1988 to 2019 and since 2022 at the Tom McCall Waterfront Park in downtown Portland, Oregon, except in 2020-21 when the COVID-19 pandemic caused it to be cancelled. OBF has become the most popular outdoor beer festival in North America, based on attendance. Each brewery brings one beer. The attendance peaked in 2014, then it has been declining since. There is a Root Beer Garden for those who are under 21 or loathe alcohol.

History

Live music was introduced in 2001. 

In 2005, OBF expanded from a three-day schedule (Friday to Sunday) to four, adding Thursday. 

The 2011 Oregon Brewers Festival featured 85 craft beers from 14 states; it attracted 80,000 people over four days. Nearly 2,000 volunteers worked at the festival, selling tokens and pouring beer, among other tasks. 

In 2013, OBF added a fifth day, moving the opening to Wednesday; they also replaced the annual plastic mug, which had been used since the festival's beginning, with a tasting glass, which for 2013 costs $7. For 2014, there are 88 beers available, in 30 styles; that does not include the more than 100 available separately in OBF's Specialty Tent.

After two years with tasting glasses made of glass, for 2015, OBF switched to a polycarbonate tasting glass; the change was in response to safety concerns raised by the Portland Police.

In 2018, OBF changed back to a four-day festival, moving the opening to Thursday. That same year, the festival added two hard ciders to the lineup, and four wines –– 2 red and 2 white –– for the first time in the festival's history.

In 2020 & 2021, this festival went on hiatus caused by the COVID-19 pandemic; the 33rd was deferred to 2022.

Related events
In recent years OBF has anchored a month of beer-related festivals in Portland, including the North American Organic Brewers Festival, the Portland International Beerfest, and the Great American Distillers Festival.

See also
Portland International Beerfest
Oregon breweries

References

External links

Beer festivals in the United States
Festivals in Portland, Oregon
Recurring events established in 1988
1988 establishments in Oregon
Annual events in Portland, Oregon
Beer gardens in the United States
Beer in Oregon
Tom McCall Waterfront Park